Bastian Seibt (born 19 March 1978 in Hamburg) is a former German rower. In 2003 and 2010 he won the World Rowing Championships in the men's lightweight eight.  He represented his native country at the 2008 Summer Olympics in Beijing, China and at the 2012 Summer Olympics.

Club
In 2008 Seibt rowed for Der Hamburger und Germania Ruder Club in his hometown Hamburg.

References

External links
  
 
 
 

1978 births
Living people
Olympic rowers of Germany
Rowers at the 2008 Summer Olympics
Rowers at the 2012 Summer Olympics
Rowers from Hamburg
World Rowing Championships medalists for Germany
German male rowers